Hili is a railway station in Hakimpur Upazila in Dinajpur District of Rangpur Division in Bangladesh.  It is right on the Bangladesh-India border and has land border crossing arrangements. The other side of the border is also Hili - Hili, Dakshin Dinajpur.

History
From 1878, the railway route from Kolkata, then called Calcutta, to Siliguri was in two laps. The first lap was a  journey along the Eastern Bengal State Railway from Calcutta Station (later renamed Sealdah) to Damookdeah Ghat on the southern bank of the Padma River, then across the river in a ferry and the second lap of the journey.  A  metre gauge line of the North Bengal Railway linked Saraghat on the northern bank of the Padma to Siliguri.

The Kolkata-Siliguri main line was converted to broad gauge in stages. The Shakole-Santahar section was converted in 1910–1914, when Hardinge Bridge was under construction. The Hardinge Bridge was opened in 1915 and the Santahar-Parbatipur section was converted in 1924. The journey to Kolkata from Hili was only eight hours prior to 1947.

During partition of India, the India-Pakistan border ran through Hili town, with around three fourths of the town in East Pakistan, later Bangladesh.  Hili railway station located in Bangladeshi territory is a stone's throw away from Indian territory.

Trade and smuggling
Much trade between Bangladesh and India  goes on via the Hili border. Smuggling is rampant at the Hili border.  Smuggled goods comprise sugar, onion, saris, medicines and even contraband drugs.  Bangladesh border guards hold up trains to help the smugglers.

References

External links
  Hili Rail Station, Hakimpur, Dinajpur- 1991
  Smuggling at the border near Hili Railway Station, 2014

Railway stations in Rangpur Division
Bangladesh–India railway border crossings
Railway stations opened in 1878